The American Congress of Rehabilitation Medicine (ACRM) is an organization of rehabilitation professionals dedicated to serving people with disabling conditions by supporting research that promotes health, independence, productivity, and quality of life; and meets the needs of rehabilitation clinicians and people with disabilities.

In order to enhance current and future research and knowledge translation, ACRM assists researchers in improving their investigations and dissemination of findings, educates providers to use evidence generated by research and deliver best practices, and advocates for funding of rehabilitation research.

The ACRM is a global community of both researchers and consumers of research in the field of rehabilitation. ACRM is the only United States-based professional association representing all members of the interdisciplinary medical rehabilitation team, including:  physicians, psychologists, rehabilitation nurses, occupational therapists, physical therapists, chiropractors, speech-language pathologists, recreation specialists, case managers, rehabilitation counselors, vocational counselors, and disability management specialists.

Organization
The ACRM is led by elected members organized into the Board of Governors. Supporting the Board of Governors are volunteer standing committees as well as a business team led by the Chief Executive Officer.

*Interdisciplinary Special Interest Group

Special interest and networking groups 
Participation in ACRM is organized around diagnostic specialties and other interests in rehabilitation. The organization has the following special interest and networking groups:
 Arts & Neuroscience Networking Group
Athlete Development & Sports Rehabilitation (ADSR) Networking Group
Brain Injury Interdisciplinary Special Interest Group (BI-ISIG)
Cancer Rehabilitation Networking Group
Complementary, Integrative Rehabilitation Medicine Networking Group
Early Career Networking Group
Geriatrics Rehabilitation Networking Group
Health Services Research Networking Group
International Networking Group
Lifestyle Medicine Networking Group
Limb Restoration Rehabilitation Networking Group
Measurement Networking Group
Military/Veterans Affairs Networking Group
Neurodegenerative Diseases Networking Group
Neuroplasticity Networking Group
Pain Rehabilitation Networking Group
Pediatric Rehabilitation Networking Group
Physicians and Clinicians Networking Group
Rehabilitation Treatment Specification Networking Group
Spinal Cord Injury Interdisciplinary Special Interest Group (SCI-ISIG)
Stroke Interdisciplinary Special Interest Group (Stroke-ISIG)
Technology Networking Group

Membership
ACRM welcomes as members all stakeholders in the field of rehabilitation, including clinicians, researchers, administrators, consultants, consumers, educators, research funders, insurers, and policymakers. Students and new entrants to the field are especially encouraged to join; a “young investigators” course offered each year as part of the annual meeting helps them to become productive rehabilitation researchers and well-connected ACRM members.

Members meet colleagues from around the world, engage with experts and mentors, learn new research strategies, access the latest clinical guidelines, advance academic and research careers, and gain opportunities to shape and lead the field of rehabilitation. Members represent various disciplines, including:

 Audiology
 Biomedical Engineering
 Biostatistics
 Case Management
 Clinical Epidemiology
 Clinical Research
 Counseling, Pastoral
 Counseling, Rehabilitation
 Counseling, Vocational
 Dietetics | Nutrition
 Health Services Research
 Neurology | Neurosurgery
 Neuropsychology
 Occupational Therapy
 Pediatrics
 Psychology
 Physiatrist
 Physical Therapy
 Psychiatry
 Recreational Therapy
 Rehabilitation Medicine
 Rehabilitation Nursing
 Rehabilitation Psychology
 Social Work
 Speech | Language Pathology

Awards
The ACRM annually honors individuals who make significant contributions to the field of rehabilitation and research in this area. These six prestigious awards are presented at the Henry B. Betts Awards Gala during the annual conference.

Coulter Lecturer Award
This distinguished lectureship honors John Stanley Coulter, MD, a past president and treasurer of the ACRM, and former editor-in-chief of the Archives of Physical Medicine and Rehabilitation. Award winners are recognized for achievements that significantly advance the field of rehabilitation.

Distinguished Member Award
Established in 1988, this award honors ACRM members who have significantly contributed to the development of ACRM, demonstrating leadership skills, organizational abilities, and public service.

Gold Key Award
This award was established in 1932 as a certificate of merit for members of the medical and allied health professions who have rendered extraordinary service to the cause of rehabilitation. It is the highest honor given by ACRM.

Licht Award
The Elizabeth and Sidney Licht award, named for a husband-wife duo that published key textbooks in rehabilitation medicine, recognizes excellence in scientific writing in rehabilitation. The award is given for the best scientific article published in the Archives of Physical Medicine and Rehabilitation in the previous year.

Lowman Award
This award was established in 1989 in honor of Edward Lowman, MD, who recognized the importance of multidisciplinary teams in rehabilitation. ACRM members whose careers reflect an energetic promotion of the spirit of interdisciplinary rehabilitation are eligible for this award.

Wilkerson Early Career Award
ACRM established the Deborah L. Wilkerson Memorial Fund in honor of this beloved member, past president, and ACRM Fellow. Deborah was devoted to improving the quality of rehabilitation and independent living services and was an advocate for individuals with disabilities. The Deborah L. Wilkerson Early Career Award is given each year during the ACRM annual conference to the most promising member early in his/her rehabilitation research career.

History

Content for this timeline was obtained from historical records, conference proceedings, and other documents of ACRM. This is in no way intended to reflect the comprehensive history, and therefore, it is highly likely that many significant events are not included. It is a summary of those events and markers that reflect the evolution of ACRM.

1923: The Congress was founded as the American College of Radiology and Physiotherapy, a professional association of physicians who used physical agents, and particularly electricity and x-rays, to diagnose and treat illness and disability. The first president was Samuel B. Childs, MD.
1925: The trend toward specialization in medicine resulted in a separation of radiology from physical therapy and a change in name to the American Congress of Physical Therapy.
1926: The Journal of Radiology, which began publication in 1920, changed its name to the Archives of Physical Therapy, X-ray, Radium and was declared the official journal of the American Congress of Physical Therapy.
1930: Albert F. Tyler, MD, the owner of the journal, presented the Archives to the Congress as a debt-free, unencumbered gift.
1932: The first Gold Key Awards were given to a total of seven people, including William L. Clark, F. Howard Humphris, and Albert F. Tyler.
1933: In a change reflecting the times, the American Congress of Physical Therapy assimilated the American Physical Therapy Association, and Albert F. Tyler, MD, was elected as president of the newly configured association.
1938: The journal name was shortened to Archives of Physical Therapy due to the decreased emphasis on X ray and radium.
1939: A specialty society was founded called the Society of Physical Therapy Physicians, which became the American Academy of Physical Medicine and Rehabilitation (AAPM&R) in 1956. The society was restricted to physicians who devoted themselves exclusively to the practice of physical medicine, then still designated ‘physical therapy’. The Archives was designated as its official journal. 
1944: The Congress again changed names, to the American Congress of Physical Medicine.
1945: The 24th Annual Meeting was canceled at the request of the National War Committee on Conventions. This was the first and only time since the Congress was founded that an annual meeting was not held. The name of the journal became the Archives of Physical Medicine. The term “physical medicine” represented a change of emphasis from the purely clinical to the scientific and diagnostic basis of the medical use of physical agents. It also served to clarify the distinction between physicians and technicians of physical therapy (clinicians now named ‘physical therapists’), a stance the American Medical Association (AMA) had recently adopted.
1949: During the annual meeting the membership voted to collaborate with the British Association of Physical Medicine in the formation of an International Federation of Physical Medicine.
1951: The first John Stanley Coulter Memorial Lecture was presented by Kristian G. Hansson, MD, and highlighted the many contributions of John S. Coulter, MD, the third association president.
1952: Increasing recognition of the relationship between physical medicine and the rapidly growing field of rehabilitation resulted in a change in name to the American Congress of Physical Medicine and Rehabilitation.
1953: The official name of the journal was changed to its present name, Archives of Physical Medicine and Rehabilitation.
1965: A thorough study of the Congress and its functions was begun with the formation of the Professional Development Committee (PDC) under the chairmanship of John W. Goldschmidt, MD. Notable accomplishments of the PDC included a study of the objectives, constitution, and structure of the Congress, sponsorship of interdisciplinary forums, and a broadening of the membership.
1966: A group of forward-looking physicians in the Congress recognized the need for a forum in which members of various rehabilitation disciplines could share their professional, scientific, and technical talents. An amendment to the Congress constitution extended membership privileges to persons "holding an earned doctoral degree and active in and contributing to the advancement of the field of rehabilitation medicine." This allowed membership to be extended to psychologists, nurses, physical therapists, occupational therapists, speech pathologists, social workers, vocational counselors, and others. The name was officially changed once again, to the American Congress of Rehabilitation Medicine (ACRM).
1968: The first Interdisciplinary Forum was held, supported by a training grant from the Department of Health, Education and Welfare's Rehabilitation Services Administration. Some of the topics included Stroke, Intellectual-Perceptual Deficits and Implications for Team Management, and Operant Conditioning.
1970: Another constitutional amendment opened the membership to rehabilitation professionals with earned master's degrees.
1972: The PDC published the landmark report "Development of the American Congress of Rehabilitation Medicine into a Multidisciplinary Professional Society". As noted in the introduction of the report, "this report reviews the methodology by which reorganization [of the association] was accomplished and records the progress made in restructuring membership, program, publications, and governance."
1973: ACRM formed the ad hoc Committee on Rehabilitation of Children to address the unique needs of this population. The committee was active for over a decade and included Dennis Mathews, Michael Alexander, Gabriella Molnar, Bruce Gans, and other noted pediatric physiatrists. One of the most notable achievements of this committee was the allotment of more time in ACRM meetings to pediatric issues.
1973: A major exhibition tracing the development of physical medicine in the United States in the past 200 years opened at the Smithsonian Institution in Washington, DC, under sponsorship of the ACRM. Entitled Triumph Over Disability, the exhibit was planned as part of the observance of the 50th anniversary of the founding of ACRM.
1975: ACRM's Social and Environmental Aspects of Rehabilitation (SEAR) Committee was formed to work in collaboration with the Legislative Committee in making legislative recommendations and in developing model architectural barrier legislation. During the Carter administration, under the direction of Chair Nancy Crewe, PhD, SEAR was asked to examine some of the issues involved in independent living and to prepare a position paper that could be used in testimony. SEAR's involvement in the independent living movement led to the 1978 Amendments of the Rehabilitation Acts of 1973.
1976: The first prize in the scientific exhibit competition was awarded to the Sexuality and Disability exhibit presented by Sandra and Ted Cole. This exhibit led to the establishment of the Sexuality and Disability Task Force. The Task Force changed its name to the Sexuality Interdisciplinary Interest Group, which in turn led to the creation of ACRM's first Special Interest Group (SIG). This was the genesis of today's Interdisciplinary SIGs.
1977: The first non-physician ACRM president, June Rothberg, PhD RN, took office. In her presidential address entitled "...And It Came to Pass," she focused on the evolution of ACRM from uni-dimensional to multi-professional in scope and interest.
1979: The first official meeting of the ACRM Head Injury Task Force, chaired by Sheldon Berrol, MD, took place at the annual meeting. Now known as the Brain Injury ISIG, this group has been very influential in the development of standards and guidelines in the brain injury rehabilitation field over the past 20 years.
1979: The article "Independent Living: From Social Movement to Analytic Paradigm" by Gerben DeJong, PhD, was printed in the October issue of the Archives. This landmark article was reprinted sixteen times in various rehabilitation-related books and journals, and translated into seven languages.
1980: The first Elizabeth and Sidney Licht Award for Excellence in Scientific Writing was presented to Carl Granger, Gary Albrecht, and Byron Hamilton for their article "Outcomes of Comprehensive Medical Rehabilitation: Measurement by PULSES Profile and the Barthel Index".
1986: Rehabilitation professionals with bachelor's degrees were admitted into membership. In financial trouble, ACRM sold a half-ownership in Archives to AAPM&R for the “sum of $10 and other good and valuable considerations”. The sale agreement stipulates that the journal could only be sold to ACRM, for $1. Editorial and financial management of the journal formally became a joint enterprise of the two organizations, which already shared offices and staff and held joint annual meetings.
1989: The first Distinguished Member Award was presented to Mary Romano, MSW (posthumously). The first Edward W. Lowman Award was presented to Wilbert Fordyce, PhD.
1990: ACRM was prominently involved in support for the Americans with Disabilities Act, which was signed into law on July 26, 1990. The ACRM separated operationally from the shared offices and management with AAPM&R. 
1991: At the annual meeting in Washington, DC, organizational politics focused on the changes resulting from the decision to separate offices and management from AAPM&R. Revisions to the constitution and bylaws were debated during the annual business meeting. Substantive changes included a restructuring of the Board of Governors to eliminate the succession through multiple offices to the presidency. An executive committee was established and provisions requiring submission of an annual budget were included. 
1993: The first independent annual meeting of ACRM was held in Denver, CO. This was the first meeting held independently from the AAPM&R since 1938.
1995: Continuing with the transition of the organizational structure, a total of six members-at-large were seated on the Board of Governors. Thomas P. Dixon, PhD, who was the last individual to be elected as fifth vice president, ascended to the presidency. Under Dixon's direction, the corporate membership program began to expand substantially.
1996: The Board of Governors began articulating a new vision for ACRM. This new vision was developed in response to the changing dynamics within healthcare and changing demographics within the membership of ACRM, specifically the loss of many physician members who previously had belonged to both ACRM and AAPM&R. 
1997: Continuing the evolution, the Board of Governors conducted an extensive study of the field of medical rehabilitation associations and professionals to determine the need and focus for ACRM in the future. Based on the findings and the coincidental release of the Institute of Medicine Report, Enabling America, the Board committed to an organizational focus devoted exclusively to rehabilitation research, with ACRM as a home for those who generate, utilize, or fund rehabilitation research. 
1998: Theodore M. Cole, MD is the second person to serve two terms as president of ACRM (1993 and 1998). Evidence of the changing focus on relevant rehabilitation research is reflected in articles published in the ACRM newsletter, Rehabilitation Outlook, and in the content of the annual educational conference. ACRM celebrates its 75th Anniversary during the annual meeting held in Seattle, WA, November 8–10, 1998.
2012: ACRM launches its new logo, which has a clean, modern look in keeping with its commitment to cutting-edge research and innovation. (The old logo was medicine oriented, with the Greek term Ἀσκληπιός (physician), the serpent-wrapped staff, and the four elements: earth, water, air and fire). The overlapping petals of the lotus flower logo visually communicate the interdisciplinary culture of ACRM. The seeds of the lotus, like ACRM, remain viable for many, many years; the oldest lotus seeds known to exist are 1300 years old. Approaching its 90th year, ACRM is vibrant and growing. The lotus is a symbol of rebirth, rising from dark and muddy waters; similarly, the ACRM community works to bring about new beginnings for people affected by disabling conditions.
2014: ACRM holds its largest annual conference to date October 7–11, 2014 in Toronto, CA.  Close to 1,500 physical medicine and rehabilitation researchers and practitioners attend.
2015: ACRM holds its annual conference to date October 25–30, 2015 in Dallas, TX, surpassing last year's total attendance.
2016: ACRM holds its annual conference to date October 30 - November 4, 2016 in Chicago, IL, surpassing last year's total attendance.
2017: ACRM holds its annual conference to date October 23-28, 2017 in Atlanta, GA, surpassing last year's total attendance.
2018: ACRM holds its annual conference to date September 30 - October 3, 2018 in Dallas, TX, surpassing last year's total attendance. ACRM launches the Archives of Rehabilitation Research and Clinical Translation, an open access journal serving the rehabilitation research community. The founding Editor-in-Chief is Jeffrey Basford, MD, PhD.
2019: ACRM holds its annual conference to date November 3 - 8, 2019 in Chicago, IL, surpassing last year's total attendance.
2020: The Archives of Physical Medicine and Rehabilitation, ACRM's flagship journal, celebrates its 100th year of continual publication.

References

External links 
 
 Archives of Physical Medicine and Rehabilitation website

Rehabilitation medicine organizations based in the United States
Medical associations based in the United States
Medical and health organizations based in Virginia